The 2000 IIHF World Women's Championships Pool B were held between March 20 – March 26, 2000 in the cities of Liepāja and Riga in Latvia.  Kazakhstan won the tournament with an impressive performance winning all five of their matches.  Additionally this advanced them to a qualification tournament for the Turin Olympics together with second place Switzerland, who narrowly edged out Norway for the privilege.  Group 'B' changed its name to Division I following this season.

For the second year, a third tier tournament was played (called 2001 Pool B Qualification) in Székesfehérvár, Hungary.

World Championship Group B

The eight participating teams were divided up into two seeded groups as below. The teams played each other once in a single round robin format. The top two teams from the group proceeded to the Final Round, while the remaining teams played in the Consolation Round. The teams would carry forward any matches against teams that they have already played in the first round, leaving just two matches to be played in the final round.

The winning team in the tournament was promoted to the 2001 World Championship, while the bottom team would be relegated to the 2003 Group B Qualification tournament.

First round

Group A

Results
All times local

Group B

Results
All times local

Playoff round

Consolation Round 5–8 Place

Results
All times local

Final Round 1–4 Place

Results
All times local

Scoring leaders

Goaltending leaders

Champions

Final standings

2001 Qualification Tournament
Two groups of four played a round robin with the group winners playing off for promotion to next years Division I tournament (Group B was renamed Division I).  The tournament was played March 22–26, 2000 in Dunaújváros and Székesfehérvár Hungary.

First round

Group A

Results
All times local

Group B

Results
All times local

Final round

Match for seventh place

Match for fifth place

Match for third place

Final

North Korea qualified for the 2001 World Championship Division I.

Scoring leaders

Goaltending leaders

References

External links
 Summary from the Women's Hockey Net
 Detailed summary from passionhockey.com
 Official IIHF Group B page
 Official IIHF Group B Qualification page

Lower
Lower
World
2000
Sport in Liepāja
2000s in Riga
Sports competitions in Riga
March 2000 sports events in Europe